Greenfield Community College may refer to: 

Greenfield Community College (Massachusetts), a community college in Greenfield, Massachusetts, United States
Greenfield Community College, Newton Aycliffe, a secondary school in Newton Aycliffe, County Durham, England

See also
Greenfield School (disambiguation)
Greenfield (disambiguation)